Denzil Haoseb is a Namibian footballer who plays as a centre-back for the Namibia national football team.

Haoseb made his debut for the senior Namibia national football team in a friendly against Botswana in Maun on 16 March 2011. He was part of the Namibia squad for the 2019 Africa Cup of Nations.

References

External links
 
 

Living people
Association football defenders
Namibian men's footballers
Namibia international footballers
Black Africa S.C. players
2019 Africa Cup of Nations players
Jomo Cosmos F.C. players
Highlands Park F.C. players
Namibian expatriate sportspeople in South Africa
Expatriate soccer players in South Africa
People from Gobabis
1991 births